Rules of the Road is a 1993 studio album by Anita O'Day.

Track listing
"Rules of the Road" (Cy Coleman, Carolyn Leigh) – 3:29
Medley: "Black Coffee"/"Detour Ahead" (Sonny Burke, Paul Francis Webster)/(Lou Carter, Herb Ellis, Johnny Frigo) – 5:18
"Shaking the Blues Away" (Irving Berlin) – 3:43
"Music That Makes Me Dance" (Bob Merrill, Jule Styne) – 5:40
"As Long as There's Music" (Sammy Cahn, Styne) – 4:11
"Sooner or Later" (Fred Ebb, Stephen Sondheim) – 5:00
"What Is a Man?" (Lorenz Hart, Richard Rodgers) – 3:28
"Here's That Rainy Day" (Johnny Burke, Jimmy Van Heusen) – 4:40
"It's You or No One" (Cahn, Styne) – 5:15
"I Told Ya I Love Ya, Now Get Out" (Carter, Ellis, Frigo) – 3:48
"Didn't We?" (Jimmy Webb) – 4:41
"Nobody Does It Better" (Marvin Hamlisch, Carole Bayer Sager) – 5:13
"Soon It's Gonna Rain" (Tom Jones, Harvey Schmidt) – 4:44
"The Lonesome Road" (Gene Austin, Nathaniel Shilkret) – 5:23

Personnel
Anita O'Day - vocals
The Jack Sheldon Orchestra
Buddy Bregman - arranger, conductor
Buddy Bregman, Alan Eichler- Producers

References

1993 albums
Anita O'Day albums
Albums arranged by Buddy Bregman
Pablo Records albums